Västkustens hjältar is a 1940 Swedish drama film directed by Lau Lauritzen Jr. and Alice O'Fredericks. It is a remake of the 1938 Danish film Blaavand melder storm, also directed by Lauritzen and O'Fredericks.

Cast
 Greta Almroth - Karin Larsson
 Wiktor Andersson - Olle Klasson
 Carl Barcklind - Lars Larsson
 Göran Bernhard - Karl Olsson as a child
 Fritiof Billquist - Karl Olsson
 Joel Carlsson - Oskar Lundberg
 Martin Ericsson - Mattias Olsson
 Nils Kihlberg - Sven
 Mona Mårtenson - Anna Olsson
 Sven-Bertil Norberg
 Yngve Nordwall - Erik Gunnarsson
 Arne Nyberg - Torsten
 Ingegerd Resén - Johanna
 Birgit Tengroth - Inger Mattson
 Tom Walter - Torvald Bergström

External links

1940 films
1940 drama films
1940s Swedish-language films
Swedish black-and-white films
Films directed by Lau Lauritzen Jr.
Films directed by Alice O'Fredericks
Remakes of Danish films
Swedish drama films
1940s Swedish films